CT Corp (formerly known as Para Group) is one of Indonesia's largest diversified group of companies. The group was founded by Chairul Tanjung in 1987. CT Corp operates consumer-centric businesses nationwide across four key divisions: financial services, media, retail, and property / entertainment.

History

Early History
CT Corp started out as a small children's shoes export business with capital of Rp 150 million, which Chairul Tanjung obtained from Bank Exim.

Financial Services
In 1996, CT Corp acquired Mega Bank and changed its name to Bank Mega. CT Corp also took over Bank Tugu and changed its name to Bank Mega Syariah.

After several years, Bank Mega then listed in the Indonesia Stock Exchange on 28 March 2001 for Rp. 1,125 per share. Since then, Bank Mega has continued to be CT Corp's largest cash flow generator.

CT Corp's financial services arm continues to grow. It launched one of Indonesia's largest digital bank, Allo Bank (IDX: BBHI) on 20 May 2022.

Media 
CT Corp's media business started with the operation of Trans TV, the group's earliest and oldest free-to-air TV channel. The turning point of Trans TV's success took place since the first quarter 2002. According to the Nielsen Media Research survey, at that time, Trans TV was ranked fifth as the highest number of adverts from 10 television stations, namely Rp 149.2 billion.

Armed with performance success, and pegged to number two at the end of 2005, Trans TV through its parent company Trans Corp in June 2006 made an MoU to buy part of TV7 shares held Kompas Gramedia Group, and changed the name and identity of TV7 company to Trans7.

CT Corp also operates digital media companies, including Indonesia's largest local news source Detik.com. The group also operates CNN and CNBC Indonesia.

Retail
The group's major entry into retail was through the acquisition of 40% stake of Carrefour's Indonesia operation in 2010, which then fully acquired by CT Corp in January 2013. Since then, the stores has been rebranded as either "Transmart Carrefour" or "Transmart".

CT Corp also operates Metro department store, high-end retail stores (i.e Hugo Boss, Versace, Armani, Furla, Etienne Aigner, Tod's, Tommy Hilfiger, Valentino, Brioni, Jimmy Choo, Mango, Geox), as well as F&B segment (i.e The Coffee Bean & Tea Leaf, Wendy's, Baskin-Robbins).

Property
Hotels and resorts under the group, called Trans Hotels and Trans Resorts, are located in key cities in Indonesia, such as Bandung, Surabaya, and Bali.

The group also operates theme parks (Trans Snow World, Trans Studios), and small-format entertainment centers (Kid City).

Relationship 
The group is known to have good relations with Anthoni Salim. Salim Group had been indebted when Para Group helped save Bank Central Asia, which was then hit by a financial crisis. With the Salim Group, Para Group partners in working on projects in Batam and Singapore. With Sinar Mas Group, Para Group also partners in the Mega Life life insurance company.

In Singapore, Para Group acquired a public company called Asia Medic, which is engaged in health care. Besides that, Para Group created a joint venture company called Gladifora. Whereas in Batam, (in collaboration with Arsikon) Para Group created a joint venture in the property sector, and has obtained a concession of around 300 hectares in a strategic location. The plan on this land will be built entertainment and residential centers. The housing is Coastarina.

Corporate identity changes 
On 1 December 2011, Chairul Tanjung inaugurated the Para Group change to CT Corp. CT Corp consists of three sub holding companies: Mega Corp, Trans Corp, and CT Global Resources which include financial services, media, retail, lifestyle, entertainment, and natural resources. Changing the name of this company also coincides with changes in the company's identity and logo. According to Chairul Tanjung, because it has been 30 years, there must be a transformation.

Corporate Governance 
Shareholders of CT Corp include Chairul Tanjung and his family members, as well as Japanese conglomerate Mitsui & Co, which invested nearly $1 billion in CT Corp in 2021.

Global investors, including Singapore's sovereign wealthfund GIC Private Limited and World Bank's International Finance Corporation, hold direct and indirect stakes in CT Corp's subsidiaries.

Business Units 
 PT Mega Corpora (Mega Corp)
 PT Bank Mega Tbk
 PT Bank Allo Indonesia Tbk (Allo Bank)
 PT Bank Syariah Mega Indonesia (Bank Mega Syariah)
 PT PFI Mega Life Insurance (PFI Mega Life)
 PT Asuransi Umum Mega (Mega Insurance)
 Mega Capital Sekuritas
 PT Mega Asset Management (Mega Asset)
 PT Mega Capital Investama (Mega Investama)
 PT Mega Finance
 PT Mega Auto Finance
 PT Mega Central Finance
 PT Trans Airways
 Garuda Indonesia (28.27%)
 Citilink
 PT Trans Corpora (Trans Corp)
 PT Trans Media Corpora (Trans Media)
 PT Televisi Transformasi Indonesia (Trans TV)
 PT Duta Visual Nusantara Tivi Tujuh (Trans7)
 PT Trans News Corpora (CNN Indonesia, CNNIndonesia.com)
 PT Trans Berita Bisnis (CNBC Indonesia, CNBCIndonesia.com)
 PT Trans Digital Media (detik Network)
 PT Agranet Multicitra Siberkom (detik.com)
 HaiBunda.com
 Insertlive.com
 beautynesia
 PT Daily Dinamika Kreasi (Female Daily)
 Mommies Daily
 Girls Beyond
 CXO Media
 PT Indonusa Telemedia (Transvision)
 PT Trans Rekan Media
 PT Trans Entertainment
 PT Trans Event Produksi (Trans Event)
 PT Trans Fashion International (Trans Fashion)
 PT Trans Fashion Indonesia
 PT Trans Mahagaya (Prada, Miu Miu, Tod's, Aigner, Brioni, Celio, Hugo Boss, Francesco Biasia, Jimmy Choo, Canali, Mango, Salvatore Ferragamo, Furla, Geox)
 PT Metropolitan Retailmart (Metro Department Store)
 Trans Fashion Thailand Co Ltd
 Wanmani Group Co Ltd (Giorgio Armani, Emporio Armani, Tod's, Canali)
 PT Trans Food & Beverage (Trans F&B)
 PT Trans Coffee (The Coffee Bean & Tea Leaf)
 PT Trans Burger (Wendy's)
 PT Trans Ice (Baskin-Robbins)
 Beanstro
 Artiste Cafe & Lounge
 PT Trans Rasa Nippon (Gyu Katsu Nikaido)
 PT Trans Rasa Oriental (Tasty Kitchen)
 PT Trans Rasa Bali (Warung Wardani Bali)
 PT Trans Retail Indonesia (Trans Retail)
 Transmart
 PT Alfa Retailindo (Transmarket)
 PT Multi Citra Abadi (Multimart)
 PT Allo Fresh Indonesia (Allo Fresh)
 Groserindo
 Electronic Pro
 Trans Hello!
 PT Trans Living Indonesia (Trans Living)
 Transmart Hardware
 Okidoki
 Breadshop
 Spord
 Seen
 PT Trans Entertainment
 PT Trans Rekreasindo (KidCity)
 PT Trans Ritel Properti (Trans Studio Mini)
 PT Trans Property Indonesia (Trans Property)
 Trans Park
 PT Trans Cibubur Property (Trans Park Cibubur)
 Trans Park Bintaro
 Trans Park Juanda
 Trans Park Lampung
 Trans Park Kupang
 The Trans Icon
 Trans Park Jember
 PT Trans Studio
 Trans Studio Bandung
 Trans Studio Makassar
 Trans Studio Bali
 Trans Studio Cibubur
 Trans Studio Resort Bandung
 Trans Studio Resort Makassar
 Trans Studio Resort Cibubur
 Trans Snow World
 Trans Snow World Bintaro
 Trans Snow World Bekasi
 Trans Studio Ski World
 PT Trans Mall Property (Trans Shopping Mall)
 PT Para Bandung Propertindo (Trans Studio Mall Bandung)
 PT Trans Kalla Makassar (Trans Studio Mall Makassar)
 PT Para Bali Propertindo (Trans Studio Mall Bali)
 PT Mega Indah Propertindo (Trans Studio Mall Cibubur)
 Trans Park Mall Bintaro
 PT Batam Indah Investindo (Trans Park Mall Juanda Bekasi)
 Trans Park Mall Jember
 PT Trans Hotel Internasional Indonesia (Trans Hotel)
 The Trans Luxury Hotel
 Ibis Bandung Trans Studio Hotel
 Aston Tanjung Pinang Hotel & Conference Center
 The Trans Resort Bali
 Four Star
 Fashion Hotel Legian
 Trans City
 Gedung Trans Media
 Gedung Transvision
 Menara Bank Mega
 Menara Bank Mega Kuningan
 Menara Bank Mega Bandung
 Menara Bank Mega Semarang
 Menara Bank Mega Makassar
 Menara Mega Syariah
 Wisma Trans Lifestyle
 Graha Trans Coffee
 Masjid Agung Trans Studio Bandung
 PT CT Agro Indonesia (CT Agro)
 PT Kaltim CT Agro
 PT Arah Tumata
 PT Wahana Kutai Kencana
 AntaVaya Group
 PT AntaVaya Corporate Travel (AntaVaya)
 PT Malqanida Firdaus (Anta Umroh)
 PT Vaya Micetama Servindo (Pergi.com)
 PT CT Corp Infrastruktur Indonesia
 PT CT Corp Digital Indonesia (CT Corp Digital)
 CT Arsa Foundation
 ZISWAF CTARSA
 berbuatbaik.id
 Duta Bangsa
 SMA Unggulan CT Arsa Foundation Medan
 SMA Unggulan CT Arsa Foundation Sukoharjo
 LSPR Trans Park Juanda Bekasi
 Yayasan Mitra Netra
 Butik ARSA

References

External links 
 Official Website

 
1987 establishments in Indonesia
Conglomerate companies of Indonesia
Companies based in Jakarta
Companies established in 1987
Privately held companies of Indonesia